"(Baby Tell Me) Can You Dance" is the lead single by Shanice from her debut album, Discovery.

Music video
The music video takes place in a city at night. The video features Shanice and many other dancers showing off their dance moves.

Track listing
7" single (AM-2939) USA
"(Baby Tell Me) Can You Dance"
"Summer Love"

12" single (012235) USA
Club Mix
Instrumental
Radio Mix
The Shep Pettibone Mix

Charts

References

External links
 Lyrics at char-star.com

Shanice songs
1987 debut singles
1987 songs
A&M Records singles
Songs written by Bryan Loren